South Victoria was a provincial electoral district in the Canadian province of British Columbia.  It first appeared on the hustings in 1894 as part of a redistribution of the old Victoria riding, along with North Victoria.  For other Victoria-area ridings please see Victoria (electoral districts).

Electoral history 
Note: winners of each election are in bold.

|- bgcolor="white"
!align="right" colspan=3|Total valid votes
!align="right"|374 
!align="right"|100.00%
!align="right"|
|- bgcolor="white"
!align="right" colspan=3|Total rejected ballots
!align="right"|
!align="right"|
!align="right"|
|- bgcolor="white"
!align="right" colspan=3|Turnout
!align="right"|%
!align="right"|
!align="right"|
|}

|- bgcolor="white"
!align="right" colspan=3|Total valid votes
!align="right"|446 
!align="right"|100.00%
!align="right"|
|- bgcolor="white"
!align="right" colspan=3|Total rejected ballots
!align="right"|
!align="right"|
!align="right"|
|- bgcolor="white"
!align="right" colspan=3|Turnout
!align="right"|%
!align="right"|
!align="right"|
|}

The South Victoria riding was succeeded in the 1903 election by Oak Bay.

Sources 

Elections BC Historical Returns

Former provincial electoral districts of British Columbia on Vancouver Island